In psychology, novelty seeking (NS) is a personality trait associated with exploratory activity in response to novel stimulation, impulsive decision making, extravagance in approach to reward cues, quick loss of temper, and avoidance of frustration.  It is measured in the Tridimensional Personality Questionnaire as well as the later version Temperament and Character Inventory and is considered one of the temperament dimensions of personality. Like the other temperament dimensions, it has been found to be highly heritable.
High NS has been suggested to be related to low dopaminergic activity.

In the revised version of the Temperament and Character Inventory (TCI-R) novelty seeking consists of the following four subscales:
 Exploratory excitability (NS1)
 Impulsiveness (NS2)
 Extravagance (NS3)
 Disorderliness (NS4)

Relationship to other personality traits
A research study found that Novelty seeking had inverse relationships with other Temperament and Character Inventory dimensions, particularly harm avoidance and to a more moderate extent self-directedness and self-transcendence. Novelty seeking is positively associated with the five factor model trait of extraversion and to a lesser extent openness to experience and is inversely associated with conscientiousness. Novelty seeking is positively related to Impulsive sensation seeking from Zuckerman's Alternative five model of personality and with psychoticism in Eysenck's model. When novelty seeking is defined as a decision process (i.e. in terms of the tradeoff between foregoing a familiar choice option in favor of deciding to explore a novel choice option), dopamine is directly shown to increase novelty seeking behavior. Specifically, blockade of the dopamine transporter, causing a rise in extracellular dopamine levels, increases the propensity of monkeys to select novel over familiar choice options.

Causes

Genetics

Although the exact causes for novelty seeking behaviors is unknown, there may be a link to genetics. Studies have found an area on the Dopamine receptor D4 gene on chromosome 11 that is characterized by several repeats in a particular base sequence. Multiple studies have identified a link to genetics, in particular one conducted by Dr. Benjamin and colleagues, where individuals who had longer alleles of this gene had higher novelty-seeking scores than individuals with the shorter allele. In another study relating to the gene and financial risk, Dr. Dreber and colleagues found a correlation between increased risk-taking and the DRD4 gene in young males. Although there are studies that support the link between NS and dopaminergic activity via DRD4, there are also studies that do not exhibit a strong correlation. The importance of DRD4 in novelty seeking is yet to be confirmed conclusively.

Dopamine
In addition to potential heredity, novelty seeking behaviors are seen with the modulation of dopamine. The overall effect of dopamine when exposed to a novel stimuli is a mass release of the neurotransmitter in reward systems of the brain including the mesolimbic pathway. The mesolimbic pathway is active in every type of addiction and is involved with reinforcement. Because of this activation in the brain, NS has been linked to personality disorders as well as substance abuse and other addictive behaviors. DRD4 receptors are highly expressed in areas of the limbic system associated with emotion and cognition. SNPs such as rs4680 have also been examined within this realm of study.

Age
It is important to note the individual's age with novelty seeking. This behavior will decrease with time, especially as the brains of adolescents and young adults finalize in development. Possible factors of variation include gender, ethnicity, temperament and environment.

See also
 Adrenaline junkie
 Attention-deficit hyperactivity disorder
 Low arousal theory
 Neophilia
 Openness to experience
 Sensation Seeking Scale

References

Personality traits